Thomas Cairney (born 9 April 1932) is a British cross-country skier. He competed in the men's 30 kilometre event at the 1956 Winter Olympics.

References

External links
 

1932 births
Living people
British male cross-country skiers
Olympic cross-country skiers of Great Britain
Cross-country skiers at the 1956 Winter Olympics
Place of birth missing (living people)